Belair-Edison is a neighborhood in the Northeastern part of Baltimore, Maryland, United States. It is located along Harford and Bel Air Roads, above Sinclair Lane, bounded on its eastern and northern side by Herring Run Park. It is a predominantly residential neighborhood with houses that range from middle class to lower income.

History

Once a white middle class and white working-class neighborhood, many white residents left the neighborhood due to the loss of jobs at General Motors and Bethlehem Steel, following by white flight that was exacerbated by blockbusting. By the 1990s, the neighborhood had transitioned from having a white majority to having an African-American majority.

References

External links
 Belair-Edison Neighborhood Profile
 "An honest look" story by neighborhood resident photographing impoverished Belair-Edison community

 
African-American history in Baltimore
American middle class
Neighborhoods in Baltimore
Working-class culture in Baltimore